YETI  is an American manufacturer specializing in outdoor products such as ice chests, vacuum-insulated stainless-steel drinkware, soft coolers, and related accessories. They are based in Austin, Texas.

History
YETI was founded by Roy and Ryan Seiders in 2006. The brothers grew up in Driftwood, Texas, and spent a large portion of their childhood outdoors. Their father Roger Seiders was an entrepreneur that designed a fishing rod epoxy. Ryan graduated from Texas A&M University in 1996 and Roy graduated from Texas Tech University in 2000.

In 2006, Ryan started Waterloo Rods and sold the company nine years later. Roy, an angler and hunter, began his career making custom boats that were designed for fishing in shallow depth areas on the Texas Gulf Coast. The avid outdoorsmen became frustrated with the quality of the coolers available and founded YETI in response.

In June 2012, a two-thirds stake of the company was purchased by private equity firm Cortec Group for $67 million.

In July 2016, the company filed with the Security and Exchange Commission for an initial public offering with plans to list on the New York Stock Exchange under the "YETI" symbol. The company was seeking a valuation of $5 billion and hoped to raise $100 million, but retracted the IPO two years later, in March 2018, citing "market conditions".

As of January 8, 2018, Yeti still was a sponsor of the PBR and the YETI "Built for the Wild" event.

In April 2018, the National Rifle Association, via its National Rifle Association Institute for Legislative Action, announced that YETI refused to be a vendor. The NRA then dropped YETI as its official supplier of coolers. This led to a backlash from NRA members, leading some to destroy YETI products they had already purchased. In response to the NRA's comment, Yeti contacted The Washington Post and said that the NRA's comment was "inaccurate" and that neither the NRA nor the NRA's Foundation was targeted, and other organizations were also included in the removal of a "group of outdated discounting programs".

On October 25, 2018, YETI became a public company via an initial public offering of 16 million shares at a price of $18 per share.

In September 2019, Yeti opened its first flagship store in Wicker Park, Chicago. Today, multiple store locations have opened in Dallas, Denver, and across Florida.

On November 4, 2020, Yeti initiated a consumer product safety recall for over 240,000 Rambler mugs, manufactured in China, for what the U.S. Consumer Product Safety Commission described as "Injury and Burn Hazards". The commission explained that the magnetic slider on the lid could malfunction and hot contents could spill. The product was sold at stores nationwide and through the company's website during October that year.

Products 
The company targets niche markets of high-end hunting and fishing enthusiasts, outdoorsmen, beach goers, and water enthusiasts. YETI sponsored professional outdoors-men and hunting and fishing shows.

Products range in price substantially, some upwards of $500.

Coolers 

YETI's "Tundra" series of coolers ranges from 20 quarts to 350 quarts. The Tundra line can be locked with two padlocks, making it certified bear-resistant according to the Interagency Grizzly Bear Committee.

YETI also makes soft-sided coolers called the "Hopper" series. The "Hopper" series coolers are designed to be lightweight and more transportable than standard YETI coolers.

YETI is known for its expensive coolers. Their most expensive one is 82 gallons and sells for $1,300. YETI has many other products besides the coolers but this is what they are best known for. The idea of these coolers was founded by the Seiders brothers: two outdoorsmen who felt there were not any coolers that could keep their catch, kills, and beverages cold for a longer period of time. The brothers teamed up with a factory in the Philippines to create an "indestructible cooler", with superior ice retention.

Other products 

YETI also sells drinkware, bags, and miscellaneous outdoor gear. YETI sells drinkware products under the "Rambler" line ranging from 10 ounces to one gallon in size. The company also makes an ice bucket called the "YETI Tank".

Sales 
YETI sells their products to various retailers such as Academy Sports and Outdoors, Bass Pro Shops, and other retailers including Amazon Marketplace, West Marine, Cabela's, REI,  and Dicks Sporting Goods.

YETI's sales increased from $147.7 million in 2015 to $468.9 million in 2016. YETI's earnings in 2015 were $14.2 million and in 2016 were $72.2 million. YETI's DTC sales accounted for "30% of revenue in 2017".

Accolades
Outside magazine calls Yeti's Rambler "the best mug ever made". Field & Stream stated that the release of Yeti's Base Camp Chair officially declared the company's "dedication to a comfy derrière". Business Insider calls them "a status symbol in the United States".

See also 
 Vacuum flask

References

Further reading

External links
 

2006 establishments in Texas
2012 mergers and acquisitions
2018 initial public offerings
American companies established in 2006
Companies listed on the New York Stock Exchange
Cooler manufacturers
Manufacturing companies based in Austin, Texas
Manufacturing companies established in 2006
Sporting goods manufacturers of the United States
Vacuum flasks